The following is a list of Peabody Award winners and honorable mentions from the years 1990 to 1999.

1990

1991

1992

1993

1994

1995

1996

1997

1998

1999

Notes
1.Nightline's 1997 award for "The Trial of Pol Pot" was offered in part to Nate Thayer, who found Pol Pot and filmed his trial.  Thayer declined the Peabody (the first to ever do so) as he did not want to share it with ABC News, whom he believed acted unethically when using his footage for pre-broadcast publicity.

References

External links
List of Peabody Award winners (1990-1999) from PeabodyAwards.com

 List1990